Urooj is a Persian and Turkish unisex name meaning "rising, mounting, exaltation, ascension".

Other language variants
Arrudye (Spanish)

People
Oruç Reis ( 1474–1518), a Barbary pirate

References

Turkish unisex given names